Michael Swan (born June 11, 1948) is an American film and TV actor.

Early life 
Swan was born in San Jose, California, the son of actress Alys Lucille (née Wilkinson) and Donald Arthur Swan.

Career
Swan started in local theater and was part of an improvisational company in the late 60's known as The Illegitimate Theater. He moved to Los Angeles and worked as a wine consultant at Wally's Liquors in Westwood. Still pursuing an acting career, he studied with David Alexander, a teacher and mentor to actors like Jack Lemmon, Walter Matthau and Ross Martin. He landed recurring roles on Bronk and Medical Center. He made more than 100 Primetime television appearances throughout the 1970s/1980s. He also appeared in several Shakespeare plays at The Will Geer Theatricum Botanicum including 7 seasons as Petruchio in The Taming of the Shrew.

In 1986, Swan landed a contract role on As the World Turns, playing Scottish adventurer Duncan McKechnie for 10 years. 

In 1998, Swan joined a second soap opera, The Bold and the Beautiful where he played the role of Adam Alexander, the long-lost ex-husband of Sally Spectra. He appeared as a contract player and as a guest star from 1998 through 2003. Since his soap appearances, Swan has starred in several films by director Roger Corman, appeared in several Primetime shows and has also done commercial work, both in on-camera appearances and in voice-over work.   He also played patriarch Daniel Trisk in the PureFlix series Hilton Head Island.

Filmography

Film

Television

References

External links

1948 births
Living people
American male film actors
American male television actors
Male actors from San Jose, California